Aslanbek Sapiev (born 27 March 1993) is a Russian Paralympic footballer. Born in Vladikavkaz, Russia, he is a graduate of North Ossetian State University and a winner of 2011 World Championship.

References

External links
 

1993 births
Living people
Paralympic 7-a-side football players of Russia
Paralympic gold medalists for Russia
Paralympic medalists in football 7-a-side
7-a-side footballers at the 2012 Summer Paralympics
Medalists at the 2012 Summer Paralympics
Sportspeople from Vladikavkaz
North Ossetian State University alumni
21st-century Russian people